Imparja Television (IMP) is an independent Australian television station servicing over , across six states and territories:  Northern Territory, South Australia, Queensland, New South Wales, Victoria and Tasmania. It is based in Alice Springs, and is controlled by Aboriginal people through ownership by Imparja Television Pty Ltd.

Imparja is the anglicised form of the pronunciation of the Arrernte word Impatye, meaning footprints. The word was used to represent that Imparja Television aims to service Arrernte people wherever they may live, from Mutitjulu to King's Canyon to Alice Springs to Tennant Creek and beyond. They describe their range as a footprint.

Broadcasting began on 2 January 1988. In 2008, Imparja Television was identified on-air and in print as Nine Imparja, following its dropping of Network Ten affiliation. In 2009, the station again identified as simply "Imparja" and "IMP", although the Nine Network's nine dots seen in the logo remain. It purchases its programming from the Nine Network.

History

Origins
The then Australian Broadcasting Tribunal was asked by the Federal Minister for Communications in October 1984 to inquire into the allocation of commercial television licences for a number of remote areas. Licences were granted in 1985 to the Golden West Network, which broadcast to Western Australia, and QSTV in north-eastern Australia.

In 1986 hearings for the allocation of the licence began, and the Central Australian Aboriginal Media Association (CAAMA), which began providing Central Australian radio programs in local languages in 1980, formed Imparja Television Pty Ltd as a company. Soon after, the Government of the Northern Territory announced support to underpin the viability of the Central Zone Remote Television Service (RCTS) by offering to purchase an estimated $2 million package of services from the successful applicant. The Government of South Australia undertook a similar promise, offering loans of $1 million to Imparja if they were successful. An extraordinary saga of political, legal and commercial intrigue then ensued during the protracted Australian Broadcasting Tribunal (ABT) hearing process, pitching Federal, State and Territory Governments against one another with loan promises being substantially watered down or withdrawn as it became apparent the CAAMA application may prevail. Windfall funding from the Australian Bicentennial Authority and the Aboriginal Development Commission ultimately underpinned the feasibility of the CAAMA bid and they were successfully allocated the licence. However subsequent Federal Administrative Tribunal court proceedings brought about by the unsuccessful applicant, Darwin based Territory Television Ltd., attempting to overturn the ABT's decision delayed construction commencement of the new service until May 1987.

By October 1987 the new station had begun to build rebroadcast sites and new studios and a main transmitter based in Alice Springs were completed. Imparja's first test program, Australia versus Sri Lanka Test Cricket, was telecast on 2 January 1988 in Alice Springs. Two weeks later, on 15 January 1988, the station was officially inaugurated at Imparja Television's head office in Alice Springs by Minister for Communications Ralph Willis and Warren Snowdon, the Australian federal member of parliament for the Division of Lingiari in Northern Territory.

Imparja became the first Aboriginal member of the Federation of Australian Commercial Television Stations and the now-defunct Regional Television Association, both dominant organisations at the time.

Imparja was chaired by Freda Glynn for its first ten years and, for a time, she was the only female chair of a television network in the world. Freda was one of the first three founders of CAAMA – the others being John Macumba and Philip Batty.

Imparja had an initial population reach of 62,000 people, which by 1993 had grown to 125,000. Imparja was available through retransmission sites at Ceduna, Coober Pedy, Leigh Creek and Woomera in South Australia, and Alice Springs, Tennant Creek, Katherine and Bathurst Island in the Northern Territory, as well as on the Optus Aurora satellite platform.

Imparja initially carried programming from all three major Australian commercial television networks, but following aggregation of market area with QSTV, it affiliated with the Nine Network and Network Ten. Imparja also screened some ABC Television and SBS Television indigenous programs, all in addition to original programs commissioned by the station.

1990s
In 1990, Imparja Local News was launched as a fifteen-minute insert of local news into the national bulletin. The station also covered the Northern Territory general election live from its Alice Springs studios. This followed the lead taken in 1989 when the station began to produce weather reports for parts of the Northern Territory, South Australia and New South Wales, presented by Lavinia Hampton.

By 1993, Imparja's viewing audience had doubled to approximately 125,000 Australians. This in turn led to the increased allocation of government funding in 1994 to produce Yamba's Playtime, which was the station's first in-house televisual production. Yamba's Playtime features the station's official mascot, "Yamba". Also in 1994, the Imparja board of directors established the Imparja Business Development Sub Committee, to monitor and provide strategic recommendations for areas of growth for the company.

In 1995, Imparja received the Telstra Indigenous Business Award for Business of the Year. Also in 1995, Imparja's satellite transmission moved from the Aussat A-Class satellites to the Optus B1 satellite, and the station's licence was renewed.

Two new in-house productions were launched in 1996. The first being the BRACS Program, which was almost fully produced by Aboriginal communities, and Corroboree Rock, an Aboriginal music program.

Imparja's parent company, Imparja Pty Ltd, converted to a proprietary company in 1997, whilst in the late 1990s, Imparja moved to digital satellite technology on the Optus Aurora platform. This meant that Imparja's satellite transmission moved from the Optus B1 satellite to the Optus C1 satellite.

In 1999, saw Imparja adopt a joint Nine and Ten network schedule, via the aggregation of Imparja’s coverage area with the Remote Eastern Australia market.

2000s
By 2001 the station's coverage area had grown to include over 430,000 people. Around this time 'Imparja Info Channel' ('Channel 31') was launched, providing additional programming, news, and community information to remote Aboriginal communities. The Aboriginal programming on this channel later became known as Indigenous Community Television (ICTV). In 2007, the whole channel was replaced by National Indigenous Television (NITV).

Imparja faced criticism by a number of community groups in 2004, following the station's decision to introduce advertising for alcohol for the first time. The network pledged to donate 30% of the total income received from alcohol advertising towards alcohol and substance abuse programs in communities.

In 2005, Imparja National News, which primarily covered the news in Alice Springs in addition to other national and international news stories, was axed. The move was taken in anticipation of the Remote Eastern & Central Australia TV1 licence area being merged with that of Darwin. Regulations imposed by the Australian Communications and Media Authority relating to minimum levels of local news coverage led to 2006 reinstatement of Imparja National News. The news service began broadcasting again from the middle of February 2006, with Ryan Liddle as presenter.

In the mid-2000s, it was widely expected that the Australian Communications and Media Authority would merge the "Darwin" and "Remote Eastern and Central Australia" commercial television licence areas. This would have most likely seen Imparja Television become a Network Ten affiliate in Darwin. However, this did not eventuate. Instead PBL Media and Southern Cross Broadcasting, the two existing Darwin Commercial licence holders were invited to bid individually or together. Their successful joint bid used a company called Darwin Digital Television.

On 3 February 2008, Imparja Television updated its logo removing the emblem, which had been present on the logo for two decades. The logo change coincided with Imparja dropping Network Ten affiliation, becoming a sole Nine Network affiliate, in addition to axing Imparja National News, and also adding Nine Network's dots to its new logo.

2010s
On 19 May 2010, the ACMA (Australian Communications and Media Authority) approved a licence for a new remote area digital-only TV channel, a joint venture by Imparja Pty Ltd and Southern Cross Central. It was launched on 30 June 2010 as "Ten Central (CDT)". It had two feeds, Ten Central North (QLD/NT) and Ten Central South (NSW/SA/Vic/Tas).

In December 2010, Imparja Television began broadcasting on terrestrial digital TV and the new VAST satellite service. This expansion included the establishment of two feeds for these platforms, Imparja North (Qld/NT) and Imparja South (NSW/SA/Vic/Tas). As of 2010, their programming is exactly the same.

Imparja Pty Ltd also began to launch digital channels 9Go! and 9Gem.

As of the moment, Imparja continues to stream the HD feed of 9Gem, which was rebranded as a standard definition channel (9Gem later launched a separate HD channel in 2019) in Nine Network-only on 26 November 2015 in its metropolitan and Darwin stations, along with 9Life, 9Rush and the relaunch of 9HD. There are currently no plans at this stage for Imparja to launch an HD simulcast or introduce 9Life and 9Rush to its viewers. It will continue with its existing lineup of three broadcast channels.

Programming

Imparja Television is a sole Nine Network affiliate. The station previously broadcast both Nine and Ten programming, however it stopped broadcasting Network Ten programming on 3 February 2008. Imparja Television has also aired  original programs produced by local Aboriginal community members, such as Bush Mechanics and the children's program Yamba's Playtime. Imparja also airs programming relating to local australian rules and community sports, as well as news updates and religious thought for the day programs. Imparja Television also regularly broadcasts films created by the Central Australian Aboriginal Media Association, which is a shareholder of its parent company.

Imparja's programming schedule is currently based on the Nine Network schedule for Sydney and Brisbane (based on Eastern Standard Time). Prior to February 2008, scheduling was generally based on Central Standard Time, reflecting its Alice Springs-based heritage. As a result, programs are now broadcast half an hour earlier than they previously would have been under the previous arrangement.

News and current affairs
Imparja does not currently produce its own evening regional news bulletin. In 2008, Imparja replaced Imparja National News – a 30-minute, weeknightly program combining local and national/international news – with local news updates, plus a 30-minute local news magazine program, Footprints (which later ceased production in 2009). The news updates were presented by Emma Groves from 2014 until July 2016. This brings Imparja's daily news service roughly into line with its competitor in the Remote Eastern and Central Australia licence area, Southern Cross Central (QQQ).

The 6:00 pm (AEST) time slot is filled by a simulcast of Nine News Queensland. Imparja cites its geographic distribution, with a majority of the remote licence area's viewers now located in Queensland, as a "key factor" in selecting the Queensland bulletin. In 2009 Imparja began airing the Darwin edition of Nine News live at 6:30 pm (AEST) on weekdays, immediately following the Brisbane edition, in place of A Current Affair – thereby restoring a Northern Territory-based bulletin to the station.

Sport
Imparja airs most sports coverage from the Nine Network, including football, rugby league, cricket, netball, golf and tennis. The station previously broadcast some motorsport and australian rules coverage until 2008.

Availability
Imparja is a free-to-air service.  it broadcasts from 28 transmission towers and over 20 remote towns, with the signal retransmitted by low-watt transmitters. It also broadcasts by satellite, into homes in around 200 very remote Indigenous communities, as well as 75,000 homes within its broader licensed area. Services are provided via VAST, which also transmits digitally for some black spots just east of the W.A. border.

Imparja Television was previously available in New Zealand until March 2008, when the New Zealand Government pressured the Australian Government to remove the service from the satellite footprint that includes New Zealand.

Imparja was available in Port Moresby in Papua New Guinea through the HiTRON subscription television service as of 2008.

Logos
Imparja Television's first logo was developed from a painting produced by an Arrernte artist and traditional owner. The logo symbolised the MacDonnell Ranges, the Todd River and the Yeperenye caterpillar. An updated version designed by Bruce Dunlop Associates debuted on 30 January 2006, adding a blue sphere behind the emblem. When Imparja re-affiliated with Nine Network in 2007, the long-time emblem was replaced by the Nine Network dots.

References

External links

Official Website

Television networks in Australia
Indigenous Australian television
English-language television stations in Australia
Television channels and stations established in 1988
Television stations in Alice Springs